The 1977 Grand National (officially known as the  News of the World Grand National for sponsorship reasons) was the 131st renewal of the Grand National horse race that took place at Aintree Racecourse near Liverpool, England, on 2 April 1977.

The race is best remembered for being Red Rum's third Grand National win, a record that still stands today. He completed the course in 9 minutes 30.3 seconds and went off as 9/1 joint-favourite.

Background

Before the race, Red Rum was generally thought too old — at the age of 12 — to win the Grand National for a third time, having come home first in 1973 and 1974, and second in 1975 and 1976. However, being ridden by jockey Tommy Stack for the second consecutive National, the gelding clinched his unprecedented third title, bringing his career earnings to a then steeplechasing record of £114,000.

Red Rum's 1976/77 season had begun badly. After an initial small win at Carlisle he appeared lacklustre in his next four races, and trainer Ginger McCain lost confidence in him. However, the horse finally returned somewhat to his best form when coming sixth in his preparatory race to the 1977 Grand National, the Greenall Whitley Chase at Haydock. In his last gallop before the National, he was back in fine form.

Red Rum was given the top weight for Aintree, but it had dropped to 11 stone 8 lb.

Race overview

A large portion of the 42-strong field was eliminated from the race on the first circuit: 19 had fallen or unseated their riders before the second circuit, including seven at the first fence. Going onto the second round, Boom Docker held a significant lead (the biggest going onto the second circuit in Grand National history) but he refused to jump the 17th fence.

It was not until Becher's Brook (the 22nd) that Red Rum went into first position, when the leader and pre-race favourite, Andy Pandy, fell. Red Rum's lead grew gradually, and he came home 25 lengths ahead of second-placed Churchtown Boy and the mare Eyecatcher in third. Eleven of the 42 runners completed the course. Churchtown Boy had won the Topham Trophy over the national fences just two days earlier when ridden by Chris Read, who finished third in this race on Eyecatcher.	
	
The 1977 National was also notable for being the first in which a female jockey participated. Twenty-one-year-old Charlotte Brew nearly completed the race, though she was a long way behind the leaders. Her horse, Barony Fort, refused at the 27th fence.

Hidden Value had fallen at the 26th and was remounted to finish 10th whilst Saucey Belle had fallen at the 22nd and was remounted to finish last.

Finishing order

Non-finishers
There were two equine fatalities during the race. Winter Rain fell at Becher's Brook on the first circuit and Zeta's Son at Valentine's second time around; both were later euthanised.

Media coverage and aftermath
In an innovation, the BBC placed an audio microphone on one of the jockeys, opting for Graham Thorner, who was partnering Prince Rock, with a view that the rider could give viewers a verbal experience of the National. The audio, however, proved unusable as Thorner, forgetting he was wired for sound, recorded three minutes of expletive-riddled content before a final tirade of expletives signaled his twelfth-fence exit. The BBC had narrowly missed out on media history as Thorner had been a last-minute replacement for the jockey who had initially agreed to be wired up, Tommy Stack. Stack, however, changed his mind in the weighing room when he saw the equipment he was to carry. He duly weighed out without a microphone, and the opportunity for the BBC to get the thoughts of a Grand National-winning jockey while in the act of making history was lost. Frank Bough presented Grand National Grandstand as regular host David Coleman was in a contract dispute with the BBC. In an historic afternoon Night Nurse and Monksfield would dead-heat in the Aintree Hurdle.

References 

 1977
Grand National
Grand National
Grand National
20th century in Merseyside